Formation may refer to:

Linguistics
 Back-formation, the process of creating a new lexeme by removing or affixes
 Word  formation, the creation of a new word by adding affixes

Mathematics and science
 Cave formation or speleothem, a secondary mineral deposit formed in a cave
 Class formation, a topological group acting on a module satisfying certain conditions
 Formation (group theory), a class of groups that is closed under some operations
 Formation constant, an equilibrium constant for the formation of a complex in solution
 Formation enthalpy, standard heat of formation of a compound
 Formation (group theory), a class of groups
 Formation (geology), a formally named rock stratum or geological unit
 Formation of rocks, how rocks are formed
 Formation and evolution of the Solar System, history of the Solar System
 Rock formation, an isolated, scenic, or spectacular surface rock outcrop
 Vegetation formation, a concept used to classify vegetation communities

Military

 Formation flying, the disciplined flight of two or more aircraft under the command of a flight leader
 Formation (military), a high-level military organization
 Tactical formation, the arrangement or deployment of moving military forces
 Formation, an element in order of battle as a formal assembly of military personnel usually to receive the course of actions (operation order) or get deployed to operations
 Formation may be tactical or ceremonial

Music
 Formation Records, a record label headed by DJ SS
 "Formation" (song), a song by American singer Beyoncé on her 2016 album Lemonade
 The Formation World Tour, concert tour by Beyoncé for her album Lemonade

Religion
 Formations or Saṅkhāra, an important Buddhist concept
 Formation (Catholic), the personal preparation that the Catholic Church offers to people with a defined mission

Sports
 Formation (association football), how team players are positioned on the pitch
 Formation (American football), the positions in which players line up before the start of a down
 Formation (bandy), how the players are positioned on the rink
 Formation dance, a style of ballroom dancing
 Formation finish, a staged motor-race finish in which multiple vehicles of the same team cross the finish line together

Other
 Contract formation in law; an offer, acceptance, consideration, and a mutual intent to be bound
 Formation 8, an American venture capital firm in San Francisco, California
 Formation level, the native material underneath a constructed road, pavement or railway
 Formation of a coalition government, led by a formateur
 Formation (rail), British English for subgrade
 Formation water, water that is produced as a byproduct during oil and gas production
 Government formation in a parliamentary system
 Formations, imprint of Ohio State University Press

See also
 
 
 Form (disambiguation)